Alaska was admitted to the Union on January 3, 1959. Alaska's United States Senate seats belong to Class 2 and Class 3. The state's current senators are Republicans Lisa Murkowski (serving since 2002) and Dan Sullivan (serving since 2015). A total of eight people have represented Alaska in the U.S. Senate. Ted Stevens was Alaska's longest serving U.S. Senator, serving from 1968 to 2009.

List of senators

|- style="height:2em"
! rowspan=5 | 1
| rowspan=5 align=left | Bob Bartlett
| rowspan=5  | Democratic
| rowspan=5 nowrap | Jan 3, 1959 –Dec 11, 1968
| Elected in 1958.
| 1
| 
| rowspan=2 | 1
| rowspan=2 | Elected in 1958.
| rowspan=7 nowrap | Jan 3, 1959 –Jan 3, 1969
| rowspan=7  | Democratic
| rowspan=7 align=right | Ernest Gruening
! rowspan=7 |1

|- style="height:2em"
| rowspan=3 | Re-elected in 1960.
| rowspan=3 | 2
| 

|- style="height:2em"
| 
| rowspan=5 | 2
| rowspan=5 | Re-elected in 1962.Lost renomination and then lost  as an independent.

|- style="height:2em"
| 

|- style="height:2em"
| Re-elected in 1966.Died.
| rowspan=5 | 3
| 

|- style="height:2em"
| colspan=3 | Vacant
| Dec 11, 1968 –Dec 24, 1968
|  

|- style="height:2em"
! rowspan=23 | 2
| rowspan=23 align=left | Ted Stevens
| rowspan=23  | Republican
| rowspan=23 nowrap | Dec 24, 1968 –Jan 3, 2009
| rowspan=3 | Appointed to continue Bartlett's term.Elected in 1970 to finish Bartlett's term.

|- style="height:2em"
| 
| rowspan=3 | 3
| rowspan=3 | Elected in 1968.
| rowspan=6 nowrap | Jan 3, 1969 –Jan 3, 1981
| rowspan=6  | Democratic
| rowspan=6 align=right | Mike Gravel
! rowspan=6 | 2
|- style="height:2em"
| 

|- style="height:2em"
| rowspan=3 | Re-elected in 1972.
| rowspan=3 | 4
| 

|- style="height:2em"
| 
| rowspan=3 | 4
| rowspan=3 | Re-elected in 1974.Lost renomination.

|- style="height:2em"
| 

|- style="height:2em"
| rowspan=3 | Re-elected in 1978.
| rowspan=3 | 5
| 

|- style="height:2em"
| 
| rowspan=3 | 5
| rowspan=3 | Elected in 1980.
| rowspan=11 nowrap | Jan 3, 1981 –Dec 2, 2002
| rowspan=11  | Republican
| rowspan=11 align=right | Frank Murkowski
! rowspan=11 | 3

|- style="height:2em"
| 

|- style="height:2em"
| rowspan=3 | Re-elected in 1984.
| rowspan=3 | 6
| 

|- style="height:2em"
| 
| rowspan=3 | 6
| rowspan=3 | Re-elected in 1986.

|- style="height:2em"
| 

|- style="height:2em"
| rowspan=3 | Re-elected in 1990.
| rowspan=3 | 7
| 

|- style="height:2em"
| 
| rowspan=3 | 7
| rowspan=3 | Re-elected in 1992.

|- style="height:2em"
| 

|- style="height:2em"
| rowspan=5 | Re-elected in 1996.
| rowspan=5 | 8
| 

|- style="height:2em"
| 
| rowspan=5 | 8
| rowspan=2 | Re-elected in 1998.Resigned when elected Governor of Alaska.

|- style="height:2em"
| 

|- style="height:2em"
|  
| Dec 2, 2002 –Dec 20, 2002
| colspan=3 | Vacant

|- style="height:2em"
| rowspan=2 | Appointed to finish her father's term.
| rowspan=14 nowrap | Dec 20, 2002 –Present
| rowspan=14  | Republican
| rowspan=14 align=right | Lisa Murkowski
! rowspan=14 | 4

|- style="height:2em"
| rowspan=3 | Re-elected in 2002.Lost re-election.
| rowspan=3 | 9
| 

|- style="height:2em"
| 
| rowspan=3 | 9
| rowspan=3 | Elected to a full term in 2004.

|- style="height:2em"
| 

|- style="height:2em"
! rowspan=3 | 3
| rowspan=3 align=left | Mark Begich
| rowspan=3  | Democratic
| rowspan=3 nowrap | Jan 3, 2009 –Jan 3, 2015
| rowspan=3 | Elected in 2008.Lost re-election.
| rowspan=3 | 10
| 

|- style="height:2em"
| 
| rowspan=3 | 10
| rowspan=3 | Lost renomination, but re-elected as a write-in candidate in 2010.

|- style="height:2em"
| 

|- style="height:2em"
! rowspan=6 | 4
| rowspan=6 align=left | Dan Sullivan
| rowspan=6  | Republican
| rowspan=6 nowrap | Jan 3, 2015 –Present
| rowspan=3 | Elected in 2014.
| rowspan=3 | 11
| 

|- style="height:2em"
| 
| rowspan=3 | 11
| rowspan=3 | Re-elected in 2016.

|- style="height:2em"
| 

|- style="height:2em"
| rowspan=3  | Re-elected in 2020.
| rowspan=3  | 12
| 

|- style="height:2em"
| 
| rowspan=3 | 12
| rowspan=3 | Re-elected in 2022.

|- style="height:2em"
| 

|- style="height:2em"
| rowspan=2 colspan=5 | To be determined in the 2026 election.
| rowspan=2| 13
| 

|- style="height:2em"
| 
| 13
| colspan=5| To be determined in the 2028 election.

In fiction 

They Shall Have Stars, the first volume in science fiction writer James Blish's Cities in Flight series, was published in 1950 and is set in a fictional 2013. A major character is Alaska Senator Bliss Wagoner, head of the Joint Congressional Committee on Space Flight, who is depicted as playing a crucial role in Humanity's spread into space. At the time of writing, Alaska was not yet a state and had no senators, but Blish correctly assumed that this would come about by 2013.

See also

 List of United States representatives from Alaska
 United States congressional delegations from Alaska
 Elections in Alaska
 Politics of Alaska
 Political party strength in Alaska

External links
 Alaska Senators, Representatives on GovTrack.us

 
United States senators
Alaska